The Una River is a small river in the Paraíba state in northeastern Brazil. It is located near Sapé and Cruz do Espírito Santo in the Mata Paraibana mesoregion.

It has a dam on it that forms Aç Pe Azevedo lake, and it flows into Salvador River (Paraíba). It is no longer than 15 km.

See also
List of rivers of Paraíba

References
Brazilian Ministry of Transport

Rivers of Paraíba